Events in the year 1972 in Cyprus.

Incumbents 

 President: Makarios III
 President of the Parliament: Glafcos Clerides

Events 

 The 1972–73 Cypriot ecclesiastical coup attempt began.

Deaths

References 

 
1970s in Cyprus
Years of the 21st century in Cyprus
Cyprus
Cyprus
Cyprus